Highland Avenue may refer to:

Historic districts
Highland Avenue Historic District (Birmingham, Alabama), listed on the National Register of Historic Places in Birmingham, Alabama  
Highland Avenue Historic District (Lexington, Missouri), listed on the National Register of Historic Places in Lafayette County, Missouri

Streets
Highland Avenue (Atlanta), also North Highland Avenue
Highland Avenue (Augusta, Georgia)
Highland Avenue (Baltimore)
Highland Avenue (Los Angeles)

Transportation
Highland Avenue station (NJ Transit)
Highland Avenue station (SEPTA)